Mathias Honsak (born 20 December 1996) is an Austrian professional footballer who plays as a left midfielder for SV Darmstadt 98.

Career
In July 2018, Honsak joined 2. Bundesliga side Holstein Kiel on loan for the 2018–19 season. After the loan spell, he signed a three-year deal with SV Darmstadt 98 on 5 July 2019.

References

External links
 
 Mathias Honsak at ÖFB

1996 births
Living people
Austrian footballers
Association football midfielders
FC Liefering players
SV Ried players
SC Rheindorf Altach players
Holstein Kiel players
SV Darmstadt 98 players
Austrian Football Bundesliga players
2. Liga (Austria) players
2. Bundesliga players
Austrian expatriate footballers
Austrian expatriate sportspeople in Germany
Expatriate footballers in Germany